Hiroshi Masuoka may refer to:

, Japanese rally driver
, Japanese voice actor